Pakistanis are the nationals and citizens of the Islamic Republic of Pakistan.

Pakistani may also refer to:

 as an adjective, something of, from or related to Pakistan
 Pakistani language

See also